The Nchingidi worm lizard (Chirindia rondoensis) is a species of amphisbaenian in the family Amphisbaenidae. The species is endemic to Tanzania.

References

Chirindia
Reptiles described in 1941
Taxa named by Arthur Loveridge
Endemic fauna of Tanzania
Reptiles of Tanzania